The Castillo of Leiva is a fortification located in Leiva,  La Rioja (Spain).

Description 

Located in the municipality of Leiva, in the autonomous community of La Rioja, (Spain). Fortified palace flanked by four octagonal towers, one in each corner, and surrounded by moans. It seems its architectures dates from the 14th and 15th centuries. It was home to the house of Leiva.

Bibliography 
 

Leiva